Gelechia bistrigella is a moth of the family Gelechiidae. It is found in North America, where it has been recorded from Ontario.

The forewings are dark brown, a little bronzed and with a little ochreous intermixed, especially in two small patches, one of which is just before the middle and the other about the middle of the wing. There is a small whitish costal streak at the beginning of the costal cilia and another at the beginning of the dorsal cilia. The hindwings are pale ochreous with a silvery lustre.

References

Moths described in 1872
Gelechia